John Watts (27 February 1821 – 18 November 1902) was a member of both the Queensland Legislative Assembly and the Queensland Legislative Council. Watts managed the Eton Vale station with Arthur Hodgson and later took it over. During his time in Queensland Watts wrote an account of farming and pastoral life, and the difficulties associated with it, as experienced by the early pioneers of South-East Queensland. He also commissioned an 18-carat gold swag necklace by Danish creator Christian Ludwig Qwist (1818-1877) who arrived in Australia circa 1852. The necklace, a fine example of silversmithing and craftsmanship. Watt's papers and necklace are held by the State Library of Queensland. The necklace is considered a treasure of the John Oxley Library.

Politics 
Watts was a member of the first Parliament of Queensland, representing the seat of Drayton and Toowoomba from 2 May 1860 till his resignation due to ill health on 26 July 1862. He was appointed to the Queensland Legislative Council on 8 April 1864 and resigned on 31 October 1864 due to having been elected as the member for Western Downs from 2 November 1864 till 18 June 1867.

Later life 
Watts returned to England in 1867 and died at Wimborne, Dorset in 1902.

Legacy 
During his time in Queensland Watts commissioned an 18-carat gold swag necklace by Danish creator Christian Ludwig Qwist (1818-1877) who arrived in Australia circa 1852. The necklace features five openwork carved gold hinged pendants and is a fine example of silversmithing and craftsmanship. The necklace is held by the State Library of Queensland and is considered a treasure of the John Oxley Library.

References

External links 

 John Watts Necklace ca. 1866 - 1869: treasure collection of the John Oxley Library
 5823 John Watts Typescript 1901
 6681 John Watts Necklace ca. 1866-69

Members of the Queensland Legislative Assembly
Members of the Queensland Legislative Council
1821 births
1902 deaths
19th-century Australian politicians